"Keyword" / "Maze" is Tohoshinki's 21st Japanese single, released on March 12, 2008. The single is the fifth and last installment of the song "Trick" in the album T. It sold the most copies out of the TRICK singles in the first week, with a total of 21,097.

Track listing

CD
 "Keyword"
 "Maze" (Jejung from 東方神起)
 "Keyword" (Less Vocal)
 "Maze" (Less Vocal) (Jejung from 東方神起)

Release history

Charts

Oricon sales charts (Japan)

Korea Top 20 foreign albums & singles

References

External links
 https://web.archive.org/web/20080409203505/http://toho-jp.net/index.html

2008 singles
TVXQ songs
2008 songs
Avex Trax singles
Rhythm Zone singles